Kevin Varga (born 30 March 1996) is a Hungarian professional footballer who plays as a midfielder for Nemzeti Bajnokság I club Debrecen and the Hungary national team.

Club career

Debrecen
On 18 August 2017, Varga played his first match for Debrecen in a 4–1 win against Vasas in the Hungarian League.

Kasımpaşa
On 2 September 2020, Varga completed a 850,000€ transfer to Kasımpaşa, signing a four-year-long contract.

Loan to Young Boys
On 9 February 2022, Varga moved on loan to Young Boys in Switzerland.

International career
He made his debut for Hungary national team on 9 June 2018 in a friendly against Australia.

On 1 June 2021, Varga was included in the final 26-man squad to represent Hungary at the rescheduled UEFA Euro 2020 tournament.

Career statistics

Club

International goals

Scores and results list Hungary's goal tally first, score column indicates score after each Varga goal.

References

External links

1996 births
Living people
People from Karcag
Association football midfielders
Hungarian footballers
Hungary under-21 international footballers
Hungary international footballers
Debreceni VSC players
Balmazújvárosi FC players
Cigánd SE players
Kasımpaşa S.K. footballers
BSC Young Boys players
Nemzeti Bajnokság I players
Nemzeti Bajnokság III players
Süper Lig players
Swiss Super League players
UEFA Euro 2020 players
Hungarian expatriate footballers
Hungarian expatriate sportspeople in Turkey
Expatriate footballers in Turkey
Hungarian expatriate sportspeople in Switzerland
Expatriate footballers in Switzerland
Sportspeople from Jász-Nagykun-Szolnok County